María José Prieto Larraín (Santiago, February 20, 1977) is a Chilean film and television actress.

María José Prieto entered the Villa María Academy school in Santiago in 1981, where she completed her primary studies and part of secondary school until 1985, after which she went to live with her family in Buenos Aires, Argentina, where she finished high school in 1994.

Back in Chile, in 1995, she entered the Pontificia Universidad Católica de Chile to study Baccalaureate in Social Sciences and Humanities, graduating in 1997. She later studied Theater at the Pontifical Catholic University (1996-1998)

María José Prieto made her television debut at age 21, in the telenovela A todo dar, produced and broadcast by Megavisión, a participation that led her to win the APES award for Best Acting Screening.

After participating in some telefilms from the same station, she traveled to Madrid, Spain, to take a circus-theater course at the LeCoq academy directed by Ana Vasquez De Castro and then return to Chile to join Channel 13 in 2001, where she acts in the Telenovela Corazón Pirata, which obtained a poor tuning.

After this stage, the actress travels to New York where she studies at the Lee Strasberg Academy, and then returns to Chile to dedicate herself mainly to theater, where she acted in works such as "Now there are the children" and "Crime and shampoo" .

In 2003, she returned to Channel 13, where she appeared in the successful television series Machos, to continue acting in that station in television series such as Tentación and Gatas y Tuercas, which were extremely successful.

In 2004 she ventured into the cinema in the box office film Mujeres Infieles.

In 2005, she signed a contract with the Chilevisión television channel to host the Manzana program and star in the first television series of that channel, the successful Vivir con 10, to later play another leading role in the second television series of the same channel, Bad Conduct.

She is also a Yogini teacher.

She is married to fellow actor Cristián Campos since 2009, and her sister is Ángela Prieto, also an actress.

Filmography

Films
 2002: "Domesticame" Director Rodrigo Terreros.
 2004: "Mujeres Infieles" Director Rodrigo Ortuzar Lynch.
 2005: "Vernissage" Directora Yael Rosemblut.
 2008: "Pecados"  Director Martín Rodríguez.
 2012: "Bombal" Director Marcelo Ferrari.
 2018: "Contra el demonio" Director José Miguel Zúñiga

Telenovelas

References 

1977 births
Chilean television actresses
Chilean film actresses
Living people
People from Santiago
Actresses from Santiago
20th-century Chilean actresses
21st-century Chilean actresses
Prieto